Insecta Mundi: A Journal of World Insect Systematics is an open access peer-reviewed scientific journal of entomology, primarily devoted to insects, specifically "any non-marine arthropod". It is published by the Center for Systematic Entomology (CSE). The journal was established in 1985 by Ross Arnett and was published in print quarterly until 2007, when it switched to an immediately online upon acceptable publication model, with a paper and media edition produced once a year.  At least one author of a manuscript must be a member of CSE for a manuscript to be considered.

Indexing and abstracting
The journal is indexed and abstracted in the following bibliographic databases:

References

Further reading

External links

 

Entomology journals and magazines
Publications established in 1985
Open access journals
English-language journals